Sheppard is the self-titled debut extended play (EP) by Australian indie pop band Sheppard, released independently on 17 August 2012. It was produced by Stuart Stuart at Analog Heart Studios.

Critical reception
Kat Hunter from The AU Review gave the extended play 8.9 out of 10 commenting on the "delicious helping of pop goodness ... danceable melodies, catchy sing-along lyrics... and perfectly whipped harmonies and group vocals."

Track listing
 Digital download
"Let Me Down Easy" – 3:51
"Hold My Tongue" – 3:41
"I'm Not a Whore" – 4:30
"Flying Away" – 3:25
"Pebble Road" – 4:00

Personnel
 Stuart Stuart – production, engineering and mixing

Charts

Weekly charts
Although the extended play was released in August 2012, it did not make an appearance on the ARIA Charts until 16 June 2013, debuting at number 38. Sheppard ultimately peaked at number 18 on 21 July 2013.

Year-end charts

Certifications

Release history

References

2012 debut EPs
Indie pop EPs
Synth-pop EPs
EPs by Australian artists
Sheppard (band) albums